Dead man or Dead Man may refer to:
 Someone who is dead (man or woman)
 Dead Man, a 1995 film written and directed by Jim Jarmusch
 Dead Man (soundtrack), a soundtrack album for the 1995 film by Neil Young
 The Dead Man, a 1989 comic strip in 2000 AD
 "The Dead Man" (short story), a 1946 short story by Jorge Luis Borges
 "The Dead Man", a 1950 short story by Fritz Lieber
 "Dead Man", a nickname and identity of WWE wrestler The Undertaker

Music
 Dead Man (band), a psychedelic rock band from Sweden
 Dead Man (album), its self-titled album, released in 2006
 "Dead Man" (Pearl Jam song)
 "Dead Man (Carry Me)", a song by Jars of Clay
 "Dead Man", a song by James from their album Wah Wah
 "Dead Man", a song by M. Ward from his album Transfiguration of Vincent

See also
 Deadman (disambiguation)
 
 Dead Man's Blood
 Dead Man's Chest (disambiguation)
 Dead Man's Curve (disambiguation)
 Dead man's hand (disambiguation)
 Dead man's switch (disambiguation)
 Dead Man's Statute
 Dead Man Walking (disambiguation)
 Dead Guy (disambiguation)